William Edward Finck (September 1, 1822 – January 25, 1901) was a U.S. Representative from Ohio.

Born in Somerset, Ohio, Finck attended the public schools and St. Joseph's College (Ohio).
He studied law.
He was admitted to the bar in 1843 and commenced practice in Somerset, Ohio.
He was an unsuccessful candidate for election in 1850 to the Thirty-second Congress.
He served as member of the State senate in 1851.
He served as delegate to the Whig National Convention in 1852.
He was again a member of the State senate in 1861.

Finck was elected as a Democrat to the Thirty-eighth and Thirty-ninth Congresses (March 4, 1863 – March 3, 1867).
He was an unsuccessful Democratic candidate for judge of the Ohio Supreme Court in 1868 and 1876.

Finck was elected as a Democrat to the Forty-third Congress to fill the vacancy caused by the resignation of Hugh J. Jewett and served from December 7, 1874, to March 3, 1875.
He resumed the practice of law.
He died in Somerset, Ohio, January 25, 1901.
He was interred in Holy Trinity Cemetery.

Sources

1822 births
1901 deaths
People from Somerset, Ohio
Ohio Whigs
Ohio state senators
Ohio lawyers
Democratic Party members of the United States House of Representatives from Ohio
19th-century American politicians